Precious Monye Onyabor (born 22 December 1974) is a Nigerian retired footballer.

Career

Monye signed with Italian side Reggiana 1919, and was loaned out to second division side Cosenza Calcio and Hungarian side Videoton, where he became the club's first ever black player. He was also loaned out to Újpest FC, winning a league title with them in 1997–98. He returned to Nigeria to get treatment for an injury before joining UTA Arad in Romania for a season. He then returned to Hungary in 2002 to rejoin Videoton.

From there, he signed for Maltese team Birkirkara in January 2004, where he spent four seasons. He switched to Ħamrun Spartans in 2007, where he played for another year.

International career
At the youth level he played in the 1989 FIFA U-16 World Championship in Scotland and the 1991 All-Africa Games, where he won a bronze medal with the national under-23 team.

His senior international debut came against Sudan on 16 August 1992 during 1994 African Cup of Nations qualification. He also played in 1994 FIFA World Cup qualification.

References

External links
 

Living people
1974 births
Nigerian footballers
Nigeria international footballers
Nigeria under-20 international footballers
Nigeria youth international footballers
Association football defenders
Association football midfielders
Enyimba F.C. players
Stationery Stores F.C. players
Sharks F.C. players
Fehérvár FC players
Cosenza Calcio players
Újpest FC players
A.C. Reggiana 1919 players
FC UTA Arad players
Birkirkara F.C. players
Ħamrun Spartans F.C. players
Nemzeti Bajnokság I players
Serie B players
Maltese Premier League players
Nigerian expatriate footballers
Nigerian expatriate sportspeople in Hungary
Nigerian expatriate sportspeople in Italy
Nigerian expatriate sportspeople in Romania
Nigerian expatriate sportspeople in Malta
Expatriate footballers in Hungary
Expatriate footballers in Italy
Expatriate footballers in Romania
Expatriate footballers in Malta
Competitors at the 1991 All-Africa Games
African Games bronze medalists for Nigeria
African Games medalists in football